Caddo is a Native American language, the traditional language of the Caddo Nation. It is critically endangered, with no exclusively Caddo-speaking community and as of 2023 only 2 speakers who acquired the language as children outside school instruction, down from 25 speakers in 1997. Caddo has several mutually intelligible dialects. The most commonly used dialects are Hasinai and Hainai; others include Kadohadacho, Natchitoches and Yatasi.

Linguistic connections
Caddo is linguistically related to the members of the Northern Caddoan language family; these include the Pawnee-Kitsai (Keechi) languages (Arikara, Kitsai, and Pawnee) and the Wichita language. Kitsai and Wichita are now extinct, and Pawnee and Arikara each have fewer surviving speakers than Caddo does.

Another language, Adai, is postulated to have been a Caddoan language while it was extant, but because of scarce resources and the language's extinct status, this connection is not conclusive, and Adai is generally considered a language isolate.

Use and language revitalization efforts 
The Caddo Nation is making a concentrated effort to save the Caddo language. The Kiwat Hasí꞉nay ('Caddo Home') foundation, located at the tribal home of Binger, Oklahoma, offers regular Caddo language classes, in addition to creating dictionaries, phrase books, and other Caddo language resources. They have also made a long-term project of trying to record and digitally archive Caddoan oral traditions, which are an important part of Caddo culture. 

As of 2010, a Caddo app is available for Android phones. As of 2012, the Caddo Nation teaches weekly language classes; language CDs, a coloring book, and an online learning website are also available. 

There is a Caddo grammar, published August 2018,
and an in-depth examination of the Caddo verb, published in 2004.

In August 2022 the Caddo Nation Language Preservation Program was launched. The program's goals are to archive resources in the language, share their resources through community events and programs, and develop a curriculum to teach the language.

Phonology

Consonants
Caddo has 19 contrastive consonants, a normal-sized consonant inventory. It is somewhat unusual in that it lacks liquid consonants. The IPA symbols for the consonants of Caddo are given below:

Caddo also features contrastive gemination of consonants, which is generally indicated in orthography by a double letter: /nɑ́ttih/ "woman."

Vowels

However, there is a great deal of phonetic variation in the short vowels. The high front vowel  is generally realized as its lower counterpart , and the high back vowel  is similarly often realized as its lower counterpart . The low central vowel  has a wider range of variation, pronounced (most commonly) as  when it is followed by any consonant except a semivowel or a laryngeal consonant, as a low central vowel (for which IPA lacks a symbol) at the end of an open syllable or when followed by a laryngeal consonant, and as  before a semivowel.

In general, the long vowels do not feature this kind of variation but are simply lengthened versions of the phonemes that are represented in the chart.

Caddo also has four diphthongs, which can be written a number of different ways; the transcription below shows the typical Caddo Nation orthography (a vowel paired with a glide) and the IPA version, represented with vowels and offglides.
ay    – English eye
aw    – English out
iw    – English ew
uy    – English boy

Tone
Caddo has three lexical tones: a low tone (e.g. /ù/), unmarked in the orthography ⟨u⟩; a high tone (e.g. /ú/), marked by an acute accent over the vowel ⟨ú⟩; and falling tone, which always occurs on long vowels (e.g. /ûː/) and is marked by a grave accent over the vowel ⟨ù꞉⟩.

Tone occurs both lexically (as a property of the word), non-lexically (as a result of tonological processes), and also as a marker of certain morphological features. For instance, the past tense marker is associated with high tone.

Tonological processes
There are three processes that can create non-lexical high tone within a syllable nucleus. See the section below for an explanation of other phonological changes which may occur in the following examples.

 H-deletion
VhCC → VHighCC
An /h/ before two consonants is deleted and the preceding vowel gains high tone:
/kiʃwɑhn-t-ʔuh/ → [kiʃwɑ́nːt'uh] "parched corn"
 Low tone-deletion
VRVLowC → VHighRC
A low tone vowel following a resonant (sonorant consonant) is deleted, and the preceding vowel gains a high tone.
/sa-baka-nah-hah/ → [sawkɑ́nːhah] "does he mean it?"
 Backwards assimilation
VRVHigh → VHighRVHigh
A vowel preceding a resonant and a high tone vowel gains high tone.
/nanɑ́/ → [nɑ́nɑ́ː] "that, that one"Phonological processes
Vowel syncope
There are two vowel syncope processes in Caddo, which both involve the loss of a low-tone vowel in certain environments. The first syncope process was described above as low tone-deletion. The second syncope process is described below:Interconsonantal syncopeVCVLowCV → VCCVA low-tone vowel in between a vowel-consonant sequence and a consonant-vowel sequence is deleted.(Shown with intermediary form): /kak#(ʔi)t'us-jaʔah/ → kahʔit'uʃaʔah → [kahʔit'uʃʔah] "foam, suds"Consonant cluster simplification
As a result of the syncope processes described above, several consonant clusters emerge that are then simplified by way of phonological process. At the present stage of research, the processes seem to be unrelated, but they represent a phonetic reduction in consonant clusters; therefore, they are listed below without much further explanation.

 nw → mm
 tw → pp
 tk → kk
 n → m / __ [+labial]
 ʔʔ → ʔ
 hh → h
 ʔ+Resonant → Resonant+ʔ / syllable final

Syllable coda simplification
Similar to the consonant cluster simplification process, there are four processes by which a syllable-final consonant is altered:

 b → w / syllable final
 d → t / syllable final
 k → h / syllable final (but not before k)
 tʃ → ʃ / syllable final

Word boundary processes
There are three word-boundary processes in Caddo, all of which occur word-initially:

 n → t / # __
 w → p / # __
 y  → d / # __
 ni-huhn-id-ah/ → [tihúndah]  "she returned"

Such processes are generally not applicable in the case of proclitics (morphemes that behave like an affix and are phonologically dependent on the morpheme to which they are attached). An example is the English articles.

Glottalization
Caddo has a glottalization process by which any voiceless stop or affricate (except p) becomes an ejective when it is followed by a glottal stop.Glottalization[-sonorant, -continuant, -voice, -labial, -spread glottis] → [+constricted glottis] / ___ [+constricted glottis, -spread glottis]A voiceless stop or affricate (except p) becomes an ejective when it is followed by a glottal stop./sik-ʔuh/ → [sik'uh] "rock"Palatalization
Caddo has a palatalization process that affects certain consonants when they are followed by /j/, with simultaneous loss of the /j/.

 Palatalization
 /kj/ → [tʃ]
 /sj/ → [ʃ]
/kak#ʔa-k'as-jaʔah/ → [kahʔak'a ʃʔah] " one's leg"

(Melnar includes a third palatization process, /tj/ → [ts]. However, /ts/ is not a palatal affricate so it has not been included here. Nevertheless, the third process probably occurs.)

Lengthening
Caddo has three processes by which a syllable nucleus (vowel) may be lengthened: 
	Syllable Lengthening Process OneVHigh(Resonant)CVC# → VHigh(Resonant)ːCVC#When the second-to-last syllable in a word has a nucleus consisting of a high tone vowel (and, optionally, a resonant), and the last syllable has the form CVC, the high tone nucleus is then lengthened./bak-'ʔawɑ́waʔ/ → [bahʔwɑ́ːwaʔ] "they said"Syllable Lengthening Process TwoV(Resonant)ʔ → V(Resonant) ː / in any prepenultimate syllableIn any syllable before the penultimate, a glottal stop coda is deleted, and the remaining nucleus is lengthened./hɑ́k#ci-(ʔi)bíhn-saʔ/ → [hɑ́hciːbíːsaʔ] " I have it on my back"'

 Syllable Lengthening Process Three
 ij → iː
 uw →uː
Any syllable nucleus with ij or uw must convert to a long vowel.

Influence 
The Caddo language word for friend, "tay-sha", is the origin of the place name Texas.

Citations

External links
 The Caddo Language: A Grammar, Texts, and Dictionary Based on Materials Collected by the Author in Oklahoma Between 1960 and 1970, Dr. Wallace Chafe, Mundart Press (October 6, 2018).
 Kiwat Hasinay Foundation
 Caddo Alphabet (PDF)
 Kúhaʔahat Oklahoma! - How to say "hello" in Caddo
 Caddo Indian Language (Hatsinai)
 Erdal Can Alkoçlar
 Search-able Caddo Language Dictionary on Socrata, created by Michael Sheyahshe (replaces Caddo WebLEX)
 OLAC resources in and about the Caddo language

Caddo
Caddoan Mississippian culture
Caddoan languages
Endangered Caddoan languages
Endangered indigenous languages of the Americas
Indigenous languages of Oklahoma
Indigenous languages of Texas
Indigenous languages of the North American Southeast